The Woman's Relief Corps (WRC) is a charitable organization in the United States, originally founded as the official women's auxiliary to the Grand Army of the Republic (GAR) in 1883. The organization was designed to assist the GAR and provide post-war relief to Union veterans. The GAR had been created as a "fraternal" organization and refused to allow women to join up until the creation of this auxiliary. It is largely dedicated to historical preservation of research and official documentation related to the WRC and GAR.

Background
The WRC expresses that among other tenets, a primary purpose is to perpetuate the memory of the Grand Army of the Republic, a veterans' advocacy organization for Union Army soldiers during the American Civil War. The WRC is the GAR's only legally recognized auxiliary and was organized at the specific request of the GAR. A formal Charter was drawn on July 25 and 26, 1883 in Denver, Colorado. It was subsequently incorporated by Public Act of the 87th Congress on September 7, 1962. The first elected National President of the organization was E. Florence Barker.

Creation 
As a result of women's roles in the war effort, they became equipped with the leadership and organizational skills that positioned them well for philanthropic organizations. They mobilized to provide aid to veterans and their families following the war. The creation of these local charities paved the basis for the origin of the WRC. From 1879, the primary criterium for eligibility to become a member of the WRC was loyalty to the Union cause, and membership was not necessarily restricted to residents of Union States.

The first chapter of the WRC began in Portland, Maine 10 years prior to the more notable one in Massachusetts. In 1879, a group of Massachusetts women from different associations started a "secret" organization that sought to more effectively unify the various local and state relief programs that had been loyal to the North during the American Civil War. In 1890, a chapter of the WRC was introduced in New Hampshire and it, along with the Massachusetts post, formed the Union Board of New England.

Black Chapters 
While most organizations prevented African Americans from joining, the WRC had numerous all black chapters in many urban cities across the country and various southern states also had detached black corps. Although the south kept their chapters segregated, the majority of the corps in the north were desegregated.

One notable African-American WRC member was Susie Taylor, who helped organize Corps 67 in Boston, Massachusetts in 1886, and over the next twelve years served as its secretary, treasurer, and president.  Two other black women, Anna Hughes and Marilla Bradbury also held officer positions in the Martin Delaney Corps.

Julia Mason Layton, a black WRC member, fought for the 1893 National Convention decision that allocated funds to African American southern members so that they could be trained to more efficiently organize and finance black veterans. She also helped to create the first all-black chapter in the Department of Potomac.

In Massachusetts, African American woman R. Adelaide Washington was elected as the president of the St. John Chambre Corps. Her election was incredibly impressive considering, at the time, this chapter was dominated by white members.

Rules 
Being the official auxiliary to the Grand Army of the Republic, the WRC could not just operate as it wished or do whatever it pleased. The founding members of the WRC had to write rules and regulations that the GAR would approve of and also ran along similar lines of what the GAR was doing. The Rules and Regulations for the Government of the Woman's Relief Corps stipulated three main objectives. The third of these objectives was to "maintain true allegiance to the United States of America" and teach patriotism and "love of country."

State/Territory departments and post 
The numbers of state and territory departments and posts changed regularly from year to year. In 1892, the WRC was made up of 45 departments, provisional departments, and detached corps of various territories and states. There was a combined total of 2,797 corps (chapters) across the country. In 1892, the WRC also had 98,209 members. Arizona, Florida, Georgia (U.S. state), Kansas, Kentucky, Maryland, New Mexico, New York (state), North Carolina, Pennsylvania, South Carolina, Tennessee, and Washington, D.C. all also had WRC posts, detached and attached, by 1916.

As desegregation of the state departments continued, members at the national level, such as president Abbie Addams, wanted to halt black corps from being created. She proposed this idea on the basis that black women were not educated enough nor interested in joining such an organization. She also wanted to investigate black chapters and dissolve them if they did not have proper permits or licenses to hold group meetings.

Interdependence of the GAR and WRC 
The WRC began as an auxiliary to the GAR, but as the GAR began to decline, the WRC was able to help promote the longevity of the republic. Because the GAR required members to be veterans of the Union, their numbers began to dwindle as generations passed. In New Jersey, the Ladies Loyal League was an auxiliary that was created by women who had evidence that they were related to Union veterans. This group never reached the same level of importance nor power of the WRC whose members were abundant and reputable. In the 20th century, the WRC gained a political foothold as it lobbied for feminist policies and pensions for Union nurses, as well as patriotic education.

Memorial Day 
Early on in the creation of the WRC, Memorial Day was used to teach patriotism and nationalism to children of all ages across the North (there was an effort in the South, but there was a great deal of resistance). The members of the Woman's Relief Corps with the assistance of children would make floral wreaths and place them alongside American Flags at the graves of Union veterans and nurses who died during and since the Civil War.

The members of the GAR and WRC viewed Memorial Day as a holy day, but by 1915, the organizations were combating the view that Memorial Day was now a holiday and the memory of the Civil War began to dwindle.

Quotes 
"For the women are much better at seeking out soldiers who are really in need of assistance than we are…A woman’s eyes are much quicker to perceive distress than a man’s."  – Van Deer Voort, The National Tribune, December 21, 1882

"Although fifty-one corps were organized in Kentucky, they did not flourish as well as they might have, and in the course of time some disbanded, due to the fact that so many colored members met at the Department Convention with the white members. Although in entire sympathy with the Lincoln Proclamation, white women of the Southland do not associate so closely with the colored race, and thus the downward pathway was started." – Martha Francis Boyd, historian

Notable people

National presidents

 E. Florence Barker, 1st
 Kate Brownlee Sherwood, 2nd
 Sarah E. Fuller
 Elizabeth D'Arcy Kinne
 Emma Stark Hampton
 Charity Rusk Craig
 Annie Turner Wittenmyer
 Mary Sears McHenry
 Susan Augusta Pike Sanders
 Margaret Ray Wickens
 Sarah C. Mink
 Emma Gilson Wallace
 Lizabeth A. Turner
 Agnes Hitt
 Sarah J. Martin
 Flo Jamison Miller
 Harriet J. Bodge
 Mary L. Carr
 Calista Robinson Jones
 Lodusky J. Taylor
 Sarah D. Winans
 Fanny E. Minot
 Abbie A. Adams
 Carrie R. Read
 Kate E. Jones
 Mary C Gilman
 Jennie Iowa Berry
 Belle C Harris
 Michelle Colburn National President 2016–2018 
 Jessica Booth
 Elizabeth Thurston

Other

Carrie Thomas Alexander-Bahrenberg, national secretary
Isabel Worrell Ball
Emma Eliza Bower
Nettie Sanford Chapin 
Jennie Florella Holmes
Della Whitney Norton
Pauline O'Neill (suffrage leader), president of 2 Arizona corps
Alice E. Heckler Peters
Kate Pier
Susie King Taylor
Mary Jewett Telford, charter member
Mandana Coleman Thorp
Laura Rosamond White
Hannah Tyler Wilcox
Hannah R. Cope Plimpton

References

External links
 Official website

 
1883 establishments in the United States
Grand Army of the Republic
Organizations established in 1883
Women's organizations based in the United States